"That's Not Me" is a song by the American rock band the Beach Boys from their 1966 album Pet Sounds. Written by Brian Wilson and Tony Asher, it is distinguished for its sophisticated harmonic structure and its sudden shifts in mood and instrumental textures. Owing to its relatively sparse orchestration, it is the track on Pet Sounds that most closely resembles a conventional rock song. 

The lyric illustrates a young man in his path toward self-discovery and independence, ending with the realization that he is better living with a lover than pursuing a life of solitude in service to his dream. Wilson felt that the song revealed "a lot about" himself. Other writers speculate that the song may have been inspired by his use of psychedelic drugs or his withdrawal from regular concert appearances in the year prior.

Wilson produced "That's Not Me" at Western Studios in February 1966 with the aid of his bandmates alongside percussionist Hal Blaine, record producer Terry Melcher, and the Wilsons' cousin Steve Korthof. Mike Love shares lead vocal with Wilson, who plays the track's prominent, buzzing organ. Brian's brothers Carl and Dennis also contribute guitar and drums, respectively.

Background and lyrics

"That's Not Me" is among the several songs written by Brian Wilson and Tony Asher for the Beach Boys' album Pet Sounds. While it is commonly understood that Wilson composed the majority of the music on Pet Sounds, Asher contended that he himself had contributed musical ideas to several songs, including "Thats Not Me". 

The lyric illustrates a young man in his path toward self-discovery and independence ("I had to prove that I could make it alone / but that's not me"). To this end, he decides to leave both his home and his lover ("I once had a dream so I packed up and split for the city"). He contemplates being successful and great "in the eyes of the world", however, he feels that it may be more meaningful to do it for the sake of "just one girl". His parents notice that he is acting out of character, possibly before he does ("My folks when I wrote and told them what I was up to said 'that's not me'"). 

As the narrator reflects on his past, he begins to understand that his personal development has not reached its full potential ("I went through all kinds of changes, took a look at myself, and said that's not me"). Ultimately, he realizes that he is better living with a lover than pursuing a life of solitude in service to his dream ("I soon found out that my lonely life wasn't so pretty"). He then begs his lover for forgiveness after having abandoned her "at the wrong time", although he is grateful that he did, for now he is "that much more sure that we're ready".

In a 1976 interview, Wilson stated, "I think "That's Not Me" reveals a lot about myself, just the idea that you're going to look at yourself and say, 'Hey, now look, that's not me, kind of square off with yourself and say 'this is me, that's not me'." Asher expressed dissatisfaction with the lyrics for the song, describing them as "labored", and lamented that he had "missed the mark". He said, "This is all a criticism of my lyric-writing, by the way; it's a very interesting series of chord changes. It goes in wonderful places that you don't expect it to. But for some reason, I found it very difficult to write to."

Music historian Jim DeRogatis states that the song was written after Wilson, influenced by psychedelic drugs, had been inspired to turn his attention inward and probe "his deep-seated self-doubts".  According to biographer Timothy White, the song was written about Wilson's feelings about his withdrawal from the group's regular touring line-up after December 1964.

Composition

Harmonic structure
"That's Not Me" is the only track on Pet Sounds with an ABAB form, with every instance of AB being repeated with development. It starts in the key of F major, ascends up a minor third to A major, and ends back in F. Musicologist Philip Lambert felt that "the move from A to F major symbolizes the narrator's journey away from home to gain a new perspective". Fusilli describes the song as "subversive" and an "avant-garde piece of pop music" partly for these key modulations.

Musicologist James E. Perone observed a melodic "sighing" motif in "That's Not Me" that recurs throughout Pet Sounds, including the preceding track "You Still Believe in Me" and the track which follows, "Don't Talk (Put Your Head on My Shoulder)". Perone explains,

Arrangement

In comparison to the other tracks on Pet Sounds, "That's Not Me" has a relatively small-scale instrumental arrangement. Critic Stewart Mason considered the track to be "the closest thing to a conventional rocker" on Pet Sounds. Dennis Wilson, whose drumming contributions on the album were limited to "That's Not Me", stated in a 1967 interview, "If you listen closely to the Pet Sounds album, you'll hear me playing jazz patterns. Some of the things definitely aren't rock and roll." Starting at 0:17, the pattern engages in extended tom drum rolls, which are rarely used in popular music.

Music historian Charles Granata compares the music of "That's Not Me" to "the spacious atmosphere" heard in Aaron Copland's Billy the Kid and Rodeo ballets; moreover, the "uncluttered arrangement (featuring guitar, organ, bass, and percussion) allows each instrument to breathe, making the tune a study in contrast and texture." Mason supports, "The start-stop quality of the tune -- a trick that Brian Wilson used quite a bit during this period of his career -- gives the song a sense of nervous tension that's exacerbated by the beaten-down, anxious quality of Tony Asher's lyrics." As written in the Student's Guide to Music Tech,

Bruce Johnston remembered of the vocal arrangement, "That's just an 'ooh and aah' song vocally. That was easy; a gymnastic experience. I'm pretty rangy in my voice. But that was really a song for a lead vocal."

Recording

Wilson produced "That's Not Me" in February 1966 at Western Studio in Hollywood. The basic track was recorded on February 15, with Brian on organ, Dennis on drums, Carl on lead guitar, and their cousin Steve Korthof joining Terry Melcher on tambourine. Bruce Johnston recounted an anecdote concerning this session:

The track was then mixed down to allow Brian and Carl to overdub a bass guitar and 12-string guitar, respectively. After another reduction mix, they overdubbed another bass and 12-string guitar part. "That's Not Me" is the only track on the album where most of the instrumentation was played by the band members themselves. It is also the only track on the album where Brian and Carl perform together on instruments, and the only track where more than two members of the group play their own instruments.

Additional percussion and vocals were overdubbed shortly thereafter. The lead vocal was sung by Mike Love with Brian Wilson. Wilson stated in 1996, "He just really nailed it, real powerful voice, very souped-up kind of a sound." When the track was remixed for stereo in 1996, Wilson asked for the "clack" sound in the bridge to be reduced in volume.

Critical reception
On May 16, 1966, "That's Not Me" was released as the third track on Pet Sounds. In his self-described "unbiased" review of the album for Record Mirror, Norman Jopling described the song as a "quizzical sort of beat ballad [with a] self-obsessed sort of lyric which is clever without being in the least appealing ... Spectorish at times."

In his 2003 book about Pet Sounds, Charles Granata writes, "While not as popular as some of the other Pet Sounds songs, its sparse orchestration and uncommon form [makes] 'That's Not Me' one of the most appealing on the record." AllMusic reviewer Stewart Mason decreed that "That's Not Me" was "a largely underappreciated gem" that had been "[o]vershadowed by the even-better tracks that surround it on side one of Pet Sounds".

Personnel
Per Craig Slowinski.

The Beach Boys
 Al Jardine – backing vocals
 Bruce Johnston – backing vocals
 Mike Love – lead vocal (verses and chorus), backing vocals
 Brian Wilson – lead vocal (chorus), backing vocals, Hammond B-3 organ, overdubbed bass guitar and Danelectro bass
 Carl Wilson – backing vocals, lead guitar, overdubbed twelve-string lead guitar
 Dennis Wilson – drums

Additional players
 Hal Blaine – "temple blocks or some other wooden instrument"
 Steve Korthof – tambourine (shaking)
 Terry Melcher – tambourine (slapping)

Technical staff
 Chuck Britz – engineer
Although the American Federation of Musicians (AFM) sheets indicate the presence of Jardine and Johnston, they did not contribute to the recording of the basic track.

Cover versions

 2012 – The Sand Band, MOJO Presents Pet Sounds Revisited
 2016 – Holy Wave, A Tribute to Pet Sounds

References

Bibliography

External links
 
 

1966 songs
The Beach Boys songs
American psychedelic rock songs
Songs written by Brian Wilson
Songs written by Tony Asher
Song recordings produced by Brian Wilson
Chamber pop songs